Martin Culpepper (or Culpeper or Colepeper;  – 10 October 1605) was an English clergyman, medical doctor, and academic at the University of Oxford.

Culpepper was educated at Winchester College, where he gained a scholarship aged 13 in 1554, and New College, Oxford, holding a fellowship 1559–1567, and graduating B.A. 1562, M.A. 1566, B.Med. 1568, D.Med. 1571.

He was elected Warden (head) of New College, Oxford in 1573, holding the post until 1599.
During his time as Warden of New College, he was also Vice-Chancellor of the University of Oxford in 1578–9.

In the church, he held these livings:
 Rector of Stanton St. John, Oxfordshire (1576)
 Dean of Chichester (1577–1601)
 Rector of Colerne, Wiltshire (1588)
 Archdeacon of Berkshire and Rector of North Moreton then in that county (1588–1605)

He acquired the manor of Astwood in Feckenham, Worcestershire in 1595, he and his brother Walter taking a 1,000-year lease.

He died on 10 October 1605 and was buried in Feckenham.

Family
He married Lettice, daughter of Humphrey Clarke of Westhawke, near Ashford, Kent. They had two sons and a daughter:
 Sir Martin Culpepper (died 1604), knighted 12 May 1604; married Joyce Aston, daughter of Sir Edward Aston; buried at Feckenham church
 Stephen Culpepper (died 1611)
 Mercy Culpepper (died 1629), married Sir Samuel Sandys , Lord of Ombersley Manor, Worcestershire, a son of Edwin Sandys, Archbishop of York.

References

1540s births
1605 deaths
Burials in Worcestershire
People from North Moreton
People educated at Winchester College
Alumni of New College, Oxford
Wardens of New College, Oxford
Vice-Chancellors of the University of Oxford
Deans of Chichester
Archdeacons of Berkshire